Eike Onnen (born 3 August 1982 in Hannover) is a German high jumper.

He comes from a sporting family with sister Imke also being a high jumper while mother Astrid Fredebold-Onnen a former heptathlete.

He finished seventh at the 2007 World Championships. He became German champion in 2005 and 2006, and represents the club LG Hannover.

He tied for third with Chris Baker in the 2016 European Athletics Championships.

His personal best jump is 2.34 metres, achieved in May 2007 in Garbsen.

International competitions

References

German Athletics Federation

External links 
 
 
 

1982 births
Living people
German male high jumpers
Sportspeople from Hanover
German national athletics champions
World Athletics Championships athletes for Germany
Athletes (track and field) at the 2016 Summer Olympics
Olympic athletes of Germany
European Athletics Championships medalists